The montane cotton rat (Sigmodon zanjonensis) is a rodent species in the family Cricetidae. It is found in the highlands of Chiapas, Mexico and Guatemala. The eastern and southern limits of its range have not yet been determined.

References

Cotton rats
Mammals of Mexico
Rodents of Central America
Mammals described in 1932